Queen Uihwa of the Jincheon Im clan was a Goryeo queen consort as the first and primary wife of King Hyejong. Their only son must lost his life for political reasons during King Gwangjong's reign without able to ascended the throne and their eldest daughter instead became Gwangjong's 2nd wife also for political alliance.

She married the 10-years-old Hyejong when he was still a Prince (태자, 太子) in 921. It was believed that the regional position of the "Jincheon Im clan" and her father's influence and power in military were taken into account in the reason that King Taejo chose her as a primary spouse to his eldest son who was weak in power and wanted to unite with the military through marriage. When he was chosen as the Crown Prince (정윤, 正胤) in 922 by recommendation of Bak Sul-hui (박술희), she also became the Crown Princess Consort (정윤비, 正胤妃). She later formally became the Queen Consort in 943 followed her husband's ascension. 

Although her death date was unknown, but it was presumed that she was also died when Hyejong got assassinated in 945 and recorded that she was buried in Sulleung tomb (순릉, 順陵) alongside him. By this marriage, Queen Uihwa became the first "Princess consort" (태자비, 太子妃) and "Crown Princess consort" (정윤비, 正胤妃) of the Goryeo dynasty.

Posthumous name
In April 1002 (5th year reign of King Mokjong), name Seong-ui (성의, 成懿) was added. 
In March 1014 (5th year reign of King Hyeonjong), name Gyeong-sin (경신, 景信) was added.
In April 1027 (18th year reign of King Hyeonjong), name Hoe-seon (회선, 懷宣) was added.
In October 1253 (40th year reign of King Gojong), name Jeong-sun (정순, 靖順) was added to her Posthumous name too.

In popular culture
 Portrayed by Kim Hyun-joo in the 2002–2003 KBS TV series The Dawn of the Empire.
 Portrayed by Im Mi-sun in the 2016 SBS TV series Moon Lovers: Scarlet Heart Ryeo.

References

External links
Queen Uihwa on Encykorea .
의화왕후 on Doosan Encyclopedia .

Royal consorts of the Goryeo Dynasty
Korean queens consort
Year of birth unknown
Year of death unknown
People from Jincheon County